A papal name or pontificial name is the regnal name taken by a pope. Both the head of the Catholic Church, usually known as the pope, and the pope of the Coptic Orthodox Church of Alexandria (Coptic pope) choose papal names. , Pope Francis is the Catholic pope, and Tawadros II or Theodoros II is the Coptic pope. This article discusses and lists the names of Catholic popes; another article has a list of Coptic Orthodox popes of Alexandria.

While popes in the early centuries retained their birth names after their accession to the papacy, later popes began to adopt a new name upon their accession. This started in the sixth century and became customary in the tenth century. Since 1555, every pope has taken a papal name.

The pontificial name is given in Latin by virtue of the pope's status as bishop of Rome and head of the Catholic Church. The pope is also given an Italian name by virtue of his Vatican citizenship and because of his position as primate of Italy. However, it is customary when referring to popes to translate the regnal name into all local languages. Thus, for example, Papa Franciscus is Papa Francesco in Italian, Papa Francisco in his native Spanish, and Pope Francis in English.

Title and honorifics

Catholic
The official style of the Catholic pope in English is "His Holiness Pope [papal name]". 'Holy Father' is another honorific often used for popes.

The full title, rarely used, of the Catholic pope in English is: "His Holiness [papal name], Bishop of Rome, Vicar of Jesus Christ, Successor of the Prince of the Apostles, Supreme Pontiff of the Universal Church, Primate of Italy, Archbishop and Metropolitan of the Roman Province, Sovereign of the Vatican City State, Servant of the servants of God".

Coptic
The official title of the leader of the Coptic Orthodox Church of Alexandria is "Pope of Alexandria and Patriarch of all Africa on the Holy See of St. Mark the Apostle, the Successor of St. Mark the Evangelist, Holy Apostle and Martyr, on the Holy Apostolic Throne of the Great City of Alexandria".

Within the Coptic Church, he is considered to be Father of Fathers, Shepherd of Shepherds, and Hierarch of all Hierarchs. Honorary titles attributed to the Hierarch of the Alexandrine Throne also include:
The Pillar and Defender of the Holy, Catholic, Apostolic Church and of the Orthodox Faith
The Dean of the Great Catechetical School of Theology of Alexandria
The Ecumenical (Universal) Judge (Arbitrator) of the Holy Apostolic and Catholic (Universal) Church	
The Thirteenth among the Holy Apostles

History
During the first centuries of the church, the bishops of Rome continued to use their baptismal names after their elections. The custom of choosing a new name began in AD 533: Mercurius deemed it inappropriate for a pope to be named after the pagan Roman god Mercury, and adopted the name John II in honor of his predecessor John I, who was venerated as a martyr. In the 10th century, clerics from beyond the Alps, especially Germany and France, acceded to the papacy and replaced their foreign-sounding names with more traditional ones.

The last pope to use his baptismal name was Marcellus II in 1555, a choice that was even then quite exceptional. Names are freely chosen by popes, and not based on any system. Names of immediate or distant predecessors, mentors, saints, or even family members – as was the case with John XXIII – have been adopted.

In 1978, Cardinal Albino Luciani became the first pope to take a double name, John Paul I, to honour his two immediate predecessors, John XXIII and Paul VI; he had been elevated to bishop by John XXIII, then to patriarch of Venice and the College of Cardinals by Paul VI. John Paul I was also the first pope in almost 1,100 years since Lando in 913 to adopt a papal name that had not previously been used. After John Paul I's sudden death a month later, Cardinal Karol Józef Wojtyła was elected and, wishing to continue his predecessor's work, became the second pope to take a double name as John Paul II. In 2013, a new name was introduced into the lineage: on being elected pope, Cardinal Jorge Mario Bergoglio selected the name Francis to emphasize the spirit of poverty and peace embodied by Saint Francis of Assisi.

Symbolism
Often the new pontiff's choice of name upon being elected to the papacy is seen as a signal to the world of whom the new pope will emulate, what policies he will seek to enact, or even the length of his reign. Such was the case with Benedict XVI – it was speculated that he chose the name because he wished to emulate Benedict XV.

Saint Peter was the first pope; no bishop of Rome has chosen the name Peter II, although there is no prohibition against doing so. Since the 1970s, some antipopes, with only a minuscule following, took the name Pope Peter II.

Probably because of the controversial 15th-century antipope known as John XXIII, this name was avoided for over 500 years until the election in 1958 of Cardinal Angelo Roncalli. Immediately upon taking the name of John, it was not known if he would be John XXIII or XXIV; he decided that he would be known as John XXIII. The number used by an antipope is ignored if possible, but this is not possible if, by the time someone is reckoned as antipope, the name has since been used by one or more legitimate popes (e.g. Benedict X was later reckoned as antipope).

Current practice
Immediately after a new pope is elected, and accepts the election, he is asked in Latin "By what name shall you be called?" The new pope chooses the name by which he will be known from that point on. The senior cardinal deacon or cardinal protodeacon then appears on the balcony of Saint Peter's to proclaim the new pope by his birth name, and announce his papal name:

Annuntio vobis gaudium magnum:
Habemus Papam!
Eminentissimum ac reverendissimum dominum,
dominum [baptismal name],
Sanctæ Romanæ Ecclesiæ Cardinalem [surname],
qui sibi nomen imposuit [papal name].
I announce to you a great joy:
We have a Pope!
The Most Eminent and Most Reverend Father,
Lord [baptismal name],
Cardinal of the Holy Roman Church [surname],
who takes to himself the name [papal name].

Frequency
On average the papal name repeats 3.29 times. The number of all popes to the present is 264; Pope Benedict IX was elected pope three times, therefore the number of pontificates is actually 266.

Notes

Citations

References
 McClintock, John. 1891. Cyclopaedia of Biblical, Theological, and Ecclesiastical Literature. Harper & Brothers. (Available online)

 
Lists of Catholic popes